Korczak is a 1990 black-and-white biographical war film directed by Andrzej Wajda and written by Agnieszka Holland, about Polish-Jewish humanitarian Janusz Korczak. An international co-production between Poland, Germany and the United Kingdom, it stars Wojciech Pszoniak as Korczak, with Ewa Dałkowska, Teresa Budzisz-Krzyzanowska, Marzena Trybala, Piotr Kozlowski, Zbigniew Zamachowski and Jan Peszek.

The film was screened out of competition at the 1990 Cannes Film Festival. The film was selected as the Polish entry for the Best Foreign Language Film at the 63rd Academy Awards, but was not accepted as a nominee.

Reception
Among the strongest defendants of the epic was Marek Edelman, the Polish Jew who survived the Warsaw Ghetto Uprising. Wajda saw the idea of showing the children being led into the Treblinka gas chambers as unnecessary addition of tearjerking moments. Annette Insdorf, a film scholar and strong supporter of Wajda, considers Korczak to be a masterpiece alongside Wajda's own Ashes and Diamonds, in her commentary of Criterion Collection's DVD release of Wajda's War Trilogy.

Cast
 Wojciech Pszoniak - Henryk Goldszmit vel Janusz Korczak
 Ewa Dałkowska - Stefania 'Stefa' Wilczynska
 Teresa Budzisz-Krzyżanowska - Maryna Falska
 Marzena Trybała - Estera
 Piotr Kozłowski - Heniek
 Zbigniew Zamachowski - Ichak Szulc
 Jan Peszek - Max Bauer
 Aleksander Bardini - Adam Czerniaków
 Maria Chwalibóg - Czerniaków's wife
 Andrzej Kopiczyński - director at Polish Radio
 Krystyna Zachwatowicz - Szloma's mother
 Zbigniew Suszyński - student 
 Jerzy Zass - German watchman on the bridge
 Wojciech Klata - Szloma
 Michał Staszczak - Józek
 Agnieszka Krukówna - Ewka (as Agnieszka Kruk)
 Anna Mucha - Sabinka

See also
 List of submissions to the 63rd Academy Awards for Best Foreign Language Film
 List of Polish submissions for the Academy Award for Best Foreign Language Film

References

External links 

Rotten Tomatoes

1990 films
Polish biographical drama films
Polish black-and-white films
1990 drama films
Holocaust films
1990s Polish-language films
Films about Jews and Judaism
Films directed by Andrzej Wajda
Films scored by Wojciech Kilar
1990s biographical drama films